Oleksandr Oleksandrovych Pikhalyonok (born 7 May 1997) is a Ukrainian professional footballer who plays as a central midfielder for Dnipro-1 in the Ukrainian Premier League.

Career
Pikhalyonok is a product of the Shakhtar youth sportive school and signed a contract with Shakhtar Donetsk in the Ukrainian Premier League in 2014.

He played in the Ukrainian Premier League Reserves and made his debut for Shakhtar Donetsk in the Ukrainian Premier League in a match against Oleksandriya on 31 May 2017.

Career statistics

International

References

External links
 
 

1997 births
Living people
Footballers from Donetsk
Ukrainian footballers
FC Shakhtar Donetsk players
FC Mariupol players
SC Dnipro-1 players
Association football midfielders
Ukrainian Premier League players
Ukraine youth international footballers
Ukraine under-21 international footballers
Ukraine international footballers